Charles Carlos Marega (September 24, 1871 – March 27, 1939) was a Canadian sculptor in the early 20th century.

He was born in Lucinico, in the commune of Gorizia, then part of the Austrian-Hungarian Empire. He received training in plaster work in Mariano, Italy and then studied in Vienna and Zurich. He met Bertha in Zurich, whom he married in 1899. He worked for a while in South Africa then moved to Canada, arriving in Vancouver in October 1909, on their way to California. The North Shore Mountains reminded Bertha of her native Switzerland, which led to them settle in Vancouver. Charles Marega lived in Canada for the rest of his life. In 1936, Bertha died. He later became a sculpture teacher at the Vancouver School of Art (now Emily Carr Institute of Art and Design). He died in 1939 at the age of 67 after teaching a class at the Vancouver School of Art.

His works include:

 King Edward VII Memorial Fountain – now at the Vancouver Art Gallery.
 President Warren Harding Memorial in Stanley Park.
 The Stanley Park "promenade" (1925), a concrete pedestrian bridge extending from a city sidewalk between the Stanley Park Causeway and the seawall in Coal Harbour. 
 Joe Fortes Memorial Fountain at English Bay.
 Michelangelo and DaVinci at Vancouver Art Gallery.
 Statues of George Vancouver and Sir Harry Burrard.
 Statues of lions at the Stanley Park entrance to the Lions Gate Bridge.
 A bust of Italian dictator Benito Mussolini, now at the Museum of Vancouver Collection. 
 14 statues for the British Columbia Parliament Buildings, Victoria, British Columbia.
 Nine stone sculpted Caryatids supporting the cornice line of the Beaux Arts style Sun Tower, 128 W. Pender St. in Vancouver, completed in 1912.
 The Seaforth Highlanders of Canada stag's head above the main doors of the Seaforth Armoury.

References

External links

 Charles Marega at Discover Vancouver
  Charles Marega at History of Metropolitan Vancouver 
 Lion sculpture wearing a Canucks jersey.

Canadian people of Italian descent
Canadian sculptors
Canadian male sculptors
Artists from Vancouver
Austro-Hungarian emigrants to Canada
Persons of National Historic Significance (Canada)
1939 deaths
1871 births
20th-century sculptors